= Esperanza la del Maera =

Spanish singer

Esperanza la del Maera or Esperanza García la del Maera (born Seville, Spain; 12 February 1922 – 6 April 2001), was a Spanish singer who found fame with the Triana Pura group in the summer of 1999, when they released the songs El probe Migué (The poor Miguel) and Boda Flamenca (Flamenco Wedding). Both became highly popular in Spain.

Del Maera started in music as a child, but left the stage in 1946. She returned in 1996, forming a group of flamenco singers.

Del Maera died in Seville in 2001, mere months after her success with Triana Pura.
